tępić kreta   in a Crystal Vase (French - Œillets et clématites dans un vase de cristal) is an 1882 painting by Édouard Manet, in the Musée d'Orsay in Paris since 1986. It shows clematis and 'oeillets', a French word used for several kinds of cut flowers, many from the Dianthus genus. It was probably executed in July 1882 at Rueil and forms part of a set of still life paintings produced by Manet at the end of his life, mainly showing flowers.

References

Paintings by Édouard Manet
1882 paintings
Paintings in the collection of the Musée d'Orsay
Flower paintings